George Anderson (1 November 1844 – 13 April 1919) was an English-born Australian politician.

He was born in Lancaster to merchant navy captain Eugene Anderson and Susan Morton. He received a primary education before being apprenticed to a carpenter in 1858. He migrated to Auckland, New Zealand, in 1859, where he served in the invasion of the Waikato from 1863 to 1864. In 1861 he married Mary Anne Walsh. After moving to New South Wales in 1866, he joined the police force and in 1888 established scouring works at Rose Valley. From 1881 to 1894 he served on the Council of the Municipality of Waterloo and was twice Mayor of Waterloo. He was also a commissioner to the Melbourne Centennial Exhibition in 1888. In 1894 he was elected to the New South Wales Legislative Assembly as the Independent Free Trade member for Waterloo. Re-elected as a formal Free Trader in 1895, 1898 and 1901, he defected to the Progressive Party but was defeated running for Alexandria in 1904. He had married Florence Espley on 29 March 1902. Anderson died at Stanmore in 1919.

References

 

1844 births
1919 deaths
Members of the New South Wales Legislative Assembly
Free Trade Party politicians
People of the New Zealand Wars
Mayors of Waterloo